The 1966 Victorian Football Association season was the 85th season of the top division of the Australian rules football competition, and the sixth season of its second division. The Division 1 premiership was won by the Port Melbourne Football Club, after it defeated Waverley in the Grand Final on 25 September by 43 points; it was Port Melbourne's ninth premiership. The Division 2 premiership was won by Prahran.

Association membership 
In July 1965, the Frankston Football Club was admitted to Division 2 of the Association for the 1966 season. The Association had been in favour of admitting Frankston for 1965, but the club failed to get a clearance from the Mornington Peninsula Football League. It was not until its third appeal for a clearance that the MPFL allowed Frankston to transfer.

Frankston's admission brought the Association to a then-record twenty clubs. It was the end of a ten-year expansion plan which the Association had first announced in 1956 to increase the size of the competition from fourteen clubs to twenty. It was the last change to the Association membership until 1982.

Grounds 
The following ground changes occurred in 1966:
 Coburg returned to Coburg Oval, after having shared North Port Oval with Port Melbourne during 1965 due to the Victorian Football League's North Melbourne Football Club having moved to Coburg.
 Sunshine moved from its original home at Selwyn Park, Albion to the newly developed Skinner Reserve, Braybrook. The City of Sunshine had built the new venue for the club after it leased Selwyn Park to the George Cross soccer club.
 Sandringham moved its home base to the St Kilda Cricket Ground for the 1966 season. The arrangement lasted only one year.
 New club Frankston played at Frankston Oval.
 The Division 1 finals returned to the St Kilda Cricket Ground, after having been played at North Port Oval for the previous three seasons.

Division 1 
The Division 1 home-and-home season was played over 18 rounds; the top four then contested the finals under the Page–McIntyre system.

Ladder

Finals

Awards 
 The leading goalkicker for the season was Johnny Walker (Preston), who kicked 78 goals during the home-and-home season and 84 goals overall.
 The J. J. Liston Trophy was won by Alan Poore (Waverley), who polled 39 votes. It was Poore's second consecutive Liston Trophy, and he became the first player ever to win the award twice – consecutively or otherwise – and the first to win any Association best and fairest award twice since Arthur Cutting's consecutive V.F.A. Medals in 1938 and 1939. Paul Ladds (Sandringham) was second with 27 votes, and Barry Ion (Yarraville) was third with 26 votes.
 Williamstown won the seconds premiership. Williamstown 14.14 (98) defeated Sandringham 11.9 (75) in the Grand Final, played as a stand-alone match on Saturday 24 September at Skinner Reserve before a crowd of 3,000.

Division 2 
The Division 2 home-and-home season was played over eighteen rounds; the top four then contested the finals under the Page–McIntyre system. All finals were played on Sundays at Toorak Park.

Ladder

Finals

Awards 
 The leading goalkicker for Division 2 was Ben Nusteling (Geelong West) who kicked 85 goals in the home-and-home season and 92 goals overall.
 The Division 2 Best and Fairest was won by Ian Williams (Geelong West), who polled 48 votes. Larry Rowe (Caulfield) was second with 27 votes, and Alex Gardiner (Box Hill) and Ben Crameri (Northcote) were equal third with 26 votes.
 Sunshine won the seconds premiership. Sunshine 12.12 (84) defeated Northcote 8.6 (54) in the Grand Final, held as a stand-alone match on Saturday 10 September at Skinner Reserve.

Notable events

Interstate matches 
The Association contested the 1966 Hobart Carnival during June. The team was coached by Perc Bushby (Coburg) and was captained by Keith Burns (Brunswick). The Association had a poor tournament, finishing last and losing all four matches by large margins; and, no Association players were selected in the All-Australian team.

Other notable events 
 Oakleigh captain-coach John Benetti was dropped from the playing team at midseason due to poor form; he immediately resigned upon being informed that the financially struggling club could not afford to pay him as a non-playing coach. Oakleigh's win–loss record was 0–9 when Benetti resigned.
 On 16 July, Yarraville 6.5 (41) defeated Dandenong 4.12 (36) after Neil Fell kicked the winning goal from a set shot in the forward pocket in the final moments of the game. Three Dandenong defenders disputed the goal umpire's call, claiming that the ball hit the post on its way through. Dandenong raised a formal protest, but it was dismissed.
 On 7 August, Box Hill played its first ever Sunday match – an away match against Northcote. Box Hill had remained opposed to Sunday football since its introduction, but the club was struggling financially and needed access to the larger crowds available on Sundays The club remained unable to play Sunday matches at home until the council permitted them in 1969.
 In the Division 1 first semi-final, Yarraville trailed Preston by 5 points at half time, before kicking eight goals to one in the third quarter to take a 39-point lead; Preston then came from behind, kicking seven goals to none in the final quarter to win by two points, with the winning goal coming seconds before the final siren.

External links 
 List of VFA/VFL Premiers

References 

Victorian Football League seasons
VFL